Barcheria is a fungal genus in the family Agaricaceae. This is a monotypic genus, containing the single sequestrate (having underground fruiting bodies) species Barcheria willisiana, found in western Australia.

Taxonomy

The type material was collected from mallee woodlands near Norseman, Western Australia. The genus name Barcheria  honours Barbara Archer, "an enthusiastic and versatile collector who has contributed much to the knowledge of the arid-land fungi of Western Australia". The specific epithet willisiana acknowledges the Jim Willis family of Victoria.

Description

They have a fragile texture, lack a stipe, and have purplish-brown scales on the outer skin (peridium). The internal gleba changes colour from cream to pale after it is exposed to air. Spores are thick walled and smooth, roughly spherical to broadly ellipsoid, and hyaline (translucent) when mounted in water or dilute potassium hydroxide. They have dimensions of 10.5–16.5 by 8–12 µm. Basidia (spore-bearing cells) are two-spored and measure 28–39.5 by 5–10 µm; cystidia are rare. The hyphae lack clamp connections.

Other sequestrate fungi in the family Agaricaceae include Montagnea, Gyrophragmium, Longula, and Endoptychum. In contrast with these genera, Barcheria lacks a stipe, the gleba changes colour upon exposure, and its spores are hyaline.

Habitat and distribution

The fungus is known only from the type locality, where it was found fruiting from July to August in red clay loam at a roadside verge. Nearby vegetation included species of Eucalyptus, Allocasuarina, and Melaleuca.

See also

 List of Agaricales genera
 List of Agaricaceae genera

References

Agaricaceae
Fungi of Australia
Monotypic Agaricales genera
Taxa named by Teresa Lebel